The year 2007 is the 19th year in the history of Shooto, a mixed martial arts promotion based in Japan. In 2007 Shooto held 22 events beginning with, Shooto: Battle Mix Tokyo 1.

Title fights

Events list

Shooto: Battle Mix Tokyo 1

Shooto: Battle Mix Tokyo 1 was an event held on January 26, 2007 at Yoyogi National Gymnasium in Tokyo, Japan.

Results

Shooto: Back To Our Roots 1

Shooto: Back To Our Roots 1 was an event held on February 17, 2007 at Yoyogi National Gymnasium in Tokyo, Japan.

Results

Shooto: It's Strong Being a Man

Shooto: It's Strong Being a Man was an event held on March 4, 2007 at Yoyogi National Gymnasium in Tokyo, Japan.

Results

Shooto: Back To Our Roots 2

Shooto: Back To Our Roots 2 was an event held on March 16, 2007 at Yoyogi National Gymnasium in Tokyo, Japan.

Results

Shooto: Gig Central 12

Shooto: Gig Central 12 was an event held on March 25, 2007 at Yoyogi National Gymnasium in Tokyo, Japan.

Results

Shooto: Battle Mix Tokyo 2

Shooto: Battle Mix Tokyo 2 was an event held on March 30, 2007 at Yoyogi National Gymnasium in Tokyo, Japan.

Results

Shooto: Gig West 7

Shooto: Gig West 7 was an event held on April 21, 2007 at Yoyogi National Gymnasium in Tokyo, Japan.

Results

Shooto: Grapplingman 6

Shooto: Grapplingman 6 was an event held on May 13, 2007 at Yoyogi National Gymnasium in Tokyo, Japan.

Results

Shooto: Back To Our Roots 3

Shooto: Back To Our Roots 3 was an event held on May 18, 2007 at Yoyogi National Gymnasium in Tokyo, Japan.

Results

Shooto: Battle Mix Tokyo 3

Shooto: Battle Mix Tokyo 3 was an event held on May 26, 2007 at Yoyogi National Gymnasium in Tokyo, Japan.

Results

Shooto: Shooting Disco 1: Saturday Night Hero

Shooto: Shooting Disco 1: Saturday Night Hero was an event held on June 2, 2007 at Yoyogi National Gymnasium in Tokyo, Japan.

Results

Shooto 2007: 6/30 in Kitazawa Town Hall

Shooto 2007: 6/30 in Kitazawa Town Hall was an event held on June 30, 2007 at Yoyogi National Gymnasium in Tokyo, Japan.

Results

Shooto: Back To Our Roots 4

Shooto: Back To Our Roots 4 was an event held on July 15, 2007 at Yoyogi National Gymnasium in Tokyo, Japan.

Results

Shooto: Battle Mix Tokyo 4

Shooto: Battle Mix Tokyo 4 was an event held on July 20, 2007 at Yoyogi National Gymnasium in Tokyo, Japan.

Results

Shooto: Shooting Disco 2: The Heat Rises Tonight

Shooto: Shooting Disco 2: The Heat Rises Tonight was an event held on August 5, 2007 at Yoyogi National Gymnasium in Tokyo, Japan.

Results

Shooto: Gig North 1

Shooto: Gig North 1 was an event held on September 2, 2007 at Yoyogi National Gymnasium in Tokyo, Japan.

Results

Shooto: Back To Our Roots 5

Shooto: Back To Our Roots 5 was an event held on September 22, 2007 at Yoyogi National Gymnasium in Tokyo, Japan.

Results

Shooto: Gig West 8

Shooto: Gig West 8 was an event held on September 29, 2007 at Yoyogi National Gymnasium in Tokyo, Japan.

Results

Shooto: Gig Central 13

Shooto: Gig Central 13 was an event held on October 8, 2007 at Yoyogi National Gymnasium in Tokyo, Japan.

Results

Shooto: Shooting Disco 3: Everybody Fight Now

Shooto: Shooting Disco 3: Everybody Fight Now was an event held on October 20, 2007 at Yoyogi National Gymnasium in Tokyo, Japan.

Results

Shooto: Back To Our Roots 6

Shooto: Back To Our Roots 6 was an event held on November 8, 2007 at Yoyogi National Gymnasium in Tokyo, Japan.

Results

Shooto: Rookie Tournament 2007 Final

Shooto: Rookie Tournament 2007 Final was an event held on December 8, 2007 at Yoyogi National Gymnasium in Tokyo, Japan.

Results

See also 
 Shooto
 List of Shooto champions
 List of Shooto Events

References

Shooto events
2007 in mixed martial arts